Greg Peterson (born 26 March 1991) is an Australian-born rugby union player currently with the Newcastle Falcons. He previously played for Glasgow Warriors. His regular playing position is lock. Peterson has played professionally in Australia and Europe. Peterson has played for the United States national rugby union team since 2014, including at the 2015 Rugby World Cup.

Club career

Peterson started with Manly in Australia. 
Peterson was named in the Waratahs squad ahead of the 2012 Super Rugby season.
In 2014, Peterson was appointed as captain of the North Harbour Rays for the teams' opening game in the inaugural season of Australia's National Rugby Championship.

Following his season with the Rays, Peterson earned a trial with Leicester Tigers and eventually signed a contract that would keep him there until the end of the 2014–15 season, but he made only a few appearances for Leicester.

Peterson signed a two-year contract with Glasgow Warriors in the Pro12 starting in the 2015–16 season.
While in Scotland he played for Glasgow Hawks when not in use by the Glasgow Warriors.
Peterson was drafted to Marr in the Scottish Premiership for the 2017–18 season.

Peterson was drafted to Currie in the Scottish Premiership for the 2018–19 season.

Peterson joined the Union Bordeaux Bègles in France on 28 December 2018, as a replacement for the injured Jandré Marais.

On 19 March 2019, Peterson returned to England to join with Newcastle Falcons in the Premiership Rugby on a two-year deal from the 2019-20 season.

International career
Peterson represented Australia under 20 in the 2011 IRB Junior World Championship.

Though born in Australia, Peterson qualified to play for the United States national team by virtue of his American grandfather. Peterson was named in the Eagles 35-man roster for their 2014 end-of-year tests against New Zealand, Romania, Tonga and Fiji. He made his debut against Romania on 8 November 2014, coming off the bench at the 62nd minute. Peterson played for the U.S. at the 2015 Rugby World Cup.

International tries

Family
Peterson's grandfather played rugby for the U.S. national team, and his father played American football at Northwestern University in Chicago.

References

External links
 Waratahs player profile
 Rugby Australia profile
 itsrugby.co.uk profile

1991 births
Australian rugby union players
New South Wales Waratahs players
Sydney (NRC team) players
Rugby union locks
Rugby union players from Sydney
Living people
Glasgow Warriors players
Leicester Tigers players
United States international rugby union players
Glasgow Hawks players
Marr RFC players
Currie RFC players
Union Bordeaux Bègles players
Newcastle Falcons players